The new Gujarat IT/ITeS policy was unveiled on 8 February 2022 at GIFT City, Gandhinagar by Chief Minister Bhupendra Patel. The objective of the policy is to strengthen the Information technology ecosystem of Gujarat and to generate 1 lakh direct jobs in the IT/ITeS sector. The goal is to improve IT export to 25,000 crore from 3,101 crore.

Key Pointers 
 Facilitate the creation of world class co-working spaces to enable any IT company to fast track their IT operations in the State.
 Establishment of the Gujarat AI School / AI Center of Excellence with the objective to become the foremost source of Industry ready skilled talent for the IT Industry.

CAPEX 
 The policy envisions CAPEX support of 25% up to INR 50 Cr. for normal projects and INR 200 Cr. for Mega Projects.
 CAPEX support for Data Center of 25% up to INR 150 Cr. and Power tariff subsidy of INR 1/unit for a period of 5 years.
 CAPEX support for Cable Landing Station (CLS) of 25% up to INR 20 Cr. and Power tariff subsidy of INR 1/unit for a period of 5 years.

OPEX 
 Under the OPEX model, the government will provide support of 15% up to INR 20 Cr. per year for normal projects and INR 40 Cr. per year for Mega Projects

Employment 
 Special initiatives to boost IT employment in the state through Employment Generation Incentive and up to 100% reimbursement of employer's EPF contribution 
 Financial support up to INR 50,000 per person through Direct Benefit Transfer (DBT) to the graduate students and working professionals for skill development
 Large-scale Information, Education and Communication (IEC) programs targeting school children and general public for improving digital literacy and enhancing awareness of Information Technology.

IT Cities / Townships 
 Incentivizing the development of IT Cities / Townships with CAPEX support up to INR 100 Cr. and relaxations in regulatory & FCI norms.

References 

Economy of Gujarat
Science and technology in Gujarat